Maldivian cuisine, also called Dhivehi cuisine, is the cuisine of the Republic of Maldives and of Minicoy, India. The traditional cuisine of Maldivians is based on three main items and their derivatives: coconuts, fish and starches.

Coconuts
The coconut is used in the grated form, squeezed to obtain coconut milk, or as coconut oil in dishes that are deep-fried. The hunigondi is the traditional Maldivian implement used to grate the coconut. It is a long low chair with a serrated steel blade at its end. Grated coconut is used in dishes such as mas huni.

The grated coconut may be alternatively soaked in water and squeezed in order to obtain coconut milk (kaashi kiru). Coconut milk is an essential ingredient in many Maldivian curries and other dishes.

Fish
The fish of choice is mostly skipjack tuna, either dried or fresh. Other similar fish species that are part of the average Maldivian diet are little tunny (latti), yellowfin tuna (kanneli), frigate tuna (raagondi), bigeye scad (mushimas), wahoo (kurumas), mahi-mahi (fiyala) and mackerel scad (rimmas). These can be eaten boiled or processed.

Processed tuna (Maldive fish) is used as pieces or as shavings. In order to make curries, the raw or the still-soft processed tuna is cut into  sections. Dry processed tuna is mainly used to make short eats called gulha, masroshi, kulhi bōkiba, kavaabu, bajiya (the local version of the Indian samosa), and fathafolhi. Mixed with coconut, onions and chili it is an essential Maldivian breakfast item, known as mas huni. Unlike Pacific islanders, Maldivians do not have a tradition of eating raw fish.

The tuna-based thick brown paste known as rihaakuru is also an essential item in Maldivian cuisine.

Starchy items
These are starches such as rice, which is eaten boiled or ground into flour, or tubers such as taro (ala), sweet potato (kattala), and cassava (dandialuvi), as well as fruits like breadfruit (bambukeyo) or screwpine (kashikeyo). Tubers and breadfruit are eaten boiled. The screwpine fruit is mostly eaten raw after having been cut into thin slices.

Curries
The most important curry in the cuisine of the Maldives is cooked with diced fresh tuna and is known as mas riha.
Kukulhu riha (chicken curry) is cooked with a different mixture of spices.

Vegetable curries in the Maldives include those that use bashi (eggplant), tora (Luffa aegyptiaca), barabō (pumpkin), chichanda (Trichosanthes cucumerina) and muranga (Moringa oleifera), as well as green unripe bananas and certain leaves as their main ingredients. Pieces of Maldive fish are normally added to give the vegetable curry a certain flavor. Curries are usually eaten with steamed rice or with roshi.

See also

 Garudhiya
 Maldive fish
 Rihaakuru

Bibliography
Xavier Romero-Frias, Eating on the Islands, Himal Southasian, Vol. 26 no. 2, pages 69–91

References

External links

Eating on the Islands - As times have changed, so has the Maldives' unique cuisine and culture
 Dhumashi
Mas huni and Masriha - Himal: Farms, Feasts, Famines; Disappearing foods
Maldives Cuisine
 Maldivian Recipes 

 
South Asian cuisine